The 1996–97 NBA season was the Raptors' second season in the National Basketball Association. The Raptors had the second overall pick in the 1996 NBA draft, and drafted Marcus Camby out of Massachusetts, and started their season with new head coach Darrell Walker. Veteran leadership was added as the team signed free agent Walt Williams, acquired Popeye Jones from the Dallas Mavericks, acquired three-point specialist Hubert Davis from the New York Knicks, and signed John Long, who came out of his retirement. The team also signed Benoit Benjamin, but released him to free agency after only just four games. Celebrating the 50th anniversary of the NBA, the Raptors started their season by wearing throwback uniforms of the Toronto Huskies in their season opener against the New York Knicks at the SkyDome on November 1, but lost to the Knicks, 107–99.

The Raptors got off to a 3–3 start to the season, but then lost six straight games afterwards, and held a 17–29 record at the All-Star break. At midseason, the team re-signed free agent Oliver Miller after a brief stint with the Dallas Mavericks, and traded Acie Earl to the Milwaukee Bucks in exchange for second-year guard Shawn Respert, while signing free agents Reggie Slater and Clifford Rozier. The Raptors finished last place in the Central Division with a 30–52 record, which was a nine-game improvement over their inaugural season.

Second-year star Damon Stoudamire averaged 20.2 points, 8.8 assists and 1.5 steals per game, while Williams averaged 16.4 points and 5.0 rebounds per game, and Camby provided the team with 14.8 points, 6.3 rebounds and 2.1 blocks per game, and was selected to the NBA All-Rookie First Team. In addition, Doug Christie contributed 14.5 points, 5.3 rebounds and 2.5 steals per game, and finished in second place in Most Improved Player voting, while Carlos Rogers averaged 9.8 points and 5.4 rebounds per game off the bench, and Jones provided with 7.8 points and 8.6 rebounds per game. 

Following the season, Davis signed with the Dallas Mavericks, while Rozier signed with the Minnesota Timberwolves, and Long retired.

Draft picks

Roster

Regular season

Highs
 November 1, 1996 – To commemorate the 50th Anniversary of the NBA, the first game of the season was played between the Raptors and the New York Knicks. Both teams wore throwback uniforms to recognize the anniversary. The Raptors wore the jerseys of the Toronto Huskies. The reason the game was played in Toronto was to recognize that the first ever NBA game was played in Toronto. The final score was 107–99 for the Knicks.
 November 8, 1996 – The Raptors pulled a huge upset by defeating the Los Angeles Lakers by a score of 93–92. One of the game's highlights was Popeye Jones blocking a shot by Shaquille O'Neal.
 December 8, 1996 – In a game against the defending NBA Champion Chicago Bulls, the Raptors pulled another upset by defeating the Bulls 97–89
 February 25, 1997 – Versus the Denver Nuggets, the Raptors had their highest point total of the season. The final score was 124–122 for the Raptors.

Lows
 January 15, 1997 – The Raptors suffer one of their worst losses of the season. It was at the hands of the defending Western Conference champion Seattle SuperSonics by a score of 122-78.

Season standings

Record vs. opponents

Game log

|- bgcolor="ffcccc" 
| 1
| November 1
| New York
| 
| Damon Stoudamire (28)
| Popeye Jones (9)
| Damon Stoudamire (10)
| SkyDome28,457
| 0-1
|- bgcolor="ffcccc" 
| 2
| November 2
| @ Charlotte
| 
| Damon Stoudamire (19)
| Carlos Rogers (8)
| Damon Stoudamire (5)
| Charlotte Coliseum24,042
| 0-2
|- bgcolor="bbffbb" 
| 3
| November 5
| Dallas
| 
| Walt Williams (34)
| Carlos Rogers (12)
| Damon Stoudamire (8)
| SkyDome17,065
| 1-2
|- bgcolor="bbffbb" 
| 4
| November 8
| L.A. Lakers
| 
| Damon Stoudamire (21)
| Damon Stoudamire (10)
| Damon Stoudamire (10)
| SkyDome27,357
| 2-2
|- bgcolor="ffcccc" 
| 5
| November 11
| Denver
| 
| Marcus Camby (26)
| Carlos Rogers (9)
| Damon Stoudamire (6)
| SkyDome17,132
| 2-3
|- bgcolor="bbffbb" 
| 6
| November 13
| Philadelphia
| 
| Marcus Camby (23)
| Popeye Jones (14)
| Damon Stoudamire (12)
| SkyDome17,385
| 3-3
|- bgcolor="ffcccc" 
| 7
| November 14
| @ New York
| 
| Marcus Camby (29)
| Popeye Jones (8)
| Damon Stoudamire (13)
| Madison Square Garden19,763
| 3-4
|- bgcolor="ffcccc" 
| 8
| November 16
| @ Orlando
| 
| Walt Williams (29)
| Doug Christie (7)
| Damon Stoudamire (5)
| Orlando Arena17,248
| 3-5
|- bgcolor="ffcccc" 
| 9
| November 19
| Seattle
| 
| Doug Christie (31)
| Popeye Jones (11)
| Marcus Camby (4)
| SkyDome18,803
| 3-6
|- bgcolor="ffcccc" 
| 10
| November 21
| Cleveland
| 
| Damon Stoudamire (24)
| Acie Earl (8)
| Damon Stoudamire (6)
| SkyDome16,835
| 3-7
|- bgcolor="ffcccc" 
| 11
| November 23
| Atlanta
| 
| Damon Stoudamire (22)
| Popeye Jones (9)
| Damon Stoudamire (8)
| SkyDome16,838
| 3-8
|- bgcolor="ffcccc" 
| 12
| November 26
| Sacramento
| 
| Damon Stoudamire (27)
| Popeye Jones (16)
| Damon Stoudamire (6)
| SkyDome15,037
| 3-9
|- bgcolor="bbffbb" 
| 13
| November 27
| Charlotte
| 
| Walt Williams (23)
| Popeye Jones (18)
| Damon Stoudamire (6)
| SkyDome15,710
| 4-9
|- bgcolor="ffcccc" 
| 14
| November 30
| @ Minnesota
| 
| Damon Stoudamire (20)
| Popeye Jones (15)
| Doug Christie, Damon Stoudamire (4)
| Target Center18,679
| 4-10

|- bgcolor="bbffbb" 
| 15
| December 2
| Houston
| 
| Damon Stoudamire (27)
| Popeye Jones (13)
| Damon Stoudamire (11)
| SkyDome17,108
| 5-10
|- bgcolor="ffcccc" 
| 16
| December 3
| @ Cleveland
| 
| Doug Christie, Acie Earl (16)
| Popeye Jones (9)
| Damon Stoudamire (11)
| Gund Arena13,494
| 5-11
|- bgcolor="bbffbb" 
| 17
| December 5
| Washington
| 
| Walt Williams (29)
| Popeye Jones (13)
| Damon Stoudamire (9)
| SkyDome15,222
| 6-11
|- bgcolor="ffcccc" 
| 18
| December 7
| @ Atlanta
| 
| Walt Williams (17)
| Popeye Jones (10)
| Doug Christie, Damon Stoudamire (3)
| Omni Coliseum11,422
| 6-12
|- bgcolor="bbffbb" 
| 19
| December 8
| Chicago
| 
| Damon Stoudamire (31)
| Popeye Jones (18)
| Damon Stoudamire (13)
| SkyDome33,385
| 7-12
|- bgcolor="ffcccc" 
| 20
| December 10
| Golden State
| 
| Damon Stoudamire (19)
| Carlos Rogers (8)
| Damon Stoudamire (10)
| SkyDome15,132
| 7-13
|- bgcolor="ffcccc" 
| 21
| December 11
| @ Boston
| 
| Damon Stoudamire (31)
| Popeye Jones (21)
| Damon Stoudamire (12)
| FleetCenter14,760
| 7-14
|- bgcolor="ffcccc" 
| 22
| December 14
| @ Miami
| 
| Walt Williams (18)
| Doug Christie, Carlos Rogers (8)
| Doug Christie (6)
| Miami Arena14,712
| 7-15
|- bgcolor="ffcccc" 
| 23
| December 16
| Detroit
| 
| Damon Stoudamire (28)
| Doug Christie, Carlos Rogers (6)
| Damon Stoudamire (8)
| SkyDome16,546
| 7-16
|- bgcolor="bbffbb" 
| 24
| December 17
| @ New Jersey
| 
| Walt Williams (24)
| Popeye Jones (12)
| Doug Christie, Popeye Jones (3)
| Continental Airlines Arena10,078
| 8-16
|- bgcolor="bbffbb" 
| 25
| December 19
| Milwaukee
| 
| Damon Stoudamire (19)
| Popeye Jones (17)
| Damon Stoudamire (12)
| SkyDome15,321
| 9-16
|- bgcolor="ffcccc" 
| 26
| December 20
| @ Cleveland
| 
| Carlos Rogers (18)
| Doug Christie (8)
| Damon Stoudamire (7)
| Gund Arena14,624
| 9-17
|- bgcolor="ffcccc" 
| 27
| December 22
| @ Indiana
| 
| Carlos Rogers (15)
| Popeye Jones (11)
| Damon Stoudamire, Walt Williams (3)
| Market Square Arena14,533
| 9-18
|- bgcolor="bbffbb" 
| 28
| December 26
| New Jersey
| 
| Damon Stoudamire (18)
| Popeye Jones (11)
| Doug Christie (7)
| Copps Coliseum16,630
| 9-19
|- bgcolor="ffcccc" 
| 29
| December 27
| @ Washington
| 
| Doug Christie (20)
| Marcus Camby (10)
| Damon Stoudamire (8)
| USAir Arena18,756
| 10-19

|- bgcolor="ffcccc" 
| 30
| January 2
| @ Orlando
| 
| Damon Stoudamire (32)
| Popeye Jones (11)
| Damon Stoudamire (12)
| Orlando Arena17,248
| 10-20
|- bgcolor="ffcccc" 
| 31
| January 4
| @ Detroit
| 
| Doug Christie (20)
| Popeye Jones (7)
| Damon Stoudamire (5)
| The Palace of Auburn Hills21,454
| 10-21
|- bgcolor="ffcccc" 
| 32
| January 7
| L.A. Clippers
| 
| Damon Stoudamire (25)
| Doug Christie (11)
| Damon Stoudamire (9)
| SkyDome15,249
| 10-22
|- bgcolor="bbffbb" 
| 33
| January 9
| Utah
| 
| Damon Stoudamire (27)
| Popeye Jones (14)
| Doug Christie (10)
| SkyDome12,410
| 11-22
|- bgcolor="bbffbb" 
| 34
| January 11
| @ New Jersey
| 
| Damon Stoudamire, Walt Williams (28)
| Marcus Camby, Popeye Jones (9)
| Doug Christie, Damon Stoudamire (9)
| Continental Airlines Arena15,527
| 12-22
|- bgcolor="ffcccc" 
| 35
| January 12
| Orlando
| 
| Walt Williams (22)
| Popeye Jones (10)
| Damon Stoudamire (14)
| SkyDome21,416
| 12-23
|- bgcolor="ffcccc" 
| 36
| January 15
| @ Seattle
| 
| Doug Christie, Carlos Rogers (15)
| Carlos Rogers, Walt Williams (7)
| Damon Stoudamire (7)
| KeyArena17,072
| 12-24
|- bgcolor="bbffbb" 
| 37
| January 17
| @ Portland
| 
| Damon Stoudamire (24)
| Popeye Jones (12)
| Doug Christie (8)
| Rose Garden20,212
| 13-24
|- bgcolor="ffcccc" 
| 38
| January 19
| @ Vancouver
| 
| Damon Stoudamire (34)
| Marcus Camby (11)
| Damon Stoudamire (6)
| General Motors Place17,474
| 13-25
|- bgcolor="bbffbb" 
| 39
| January 21
| Minnesota
| 
| Walt Williams (32)
| Popeye Jones (10)
| Damon Stoudamire (17)
| SkyDome15,589
| 14-25
|- bgcolor="ffcccc"
| 40
| January 23
| Miami
| 
| Walt Williams (23)
| Marcus Camby (10)
| Damon Stoudamire (11)
| SkyDome15,817
| 14-26
|- bgcolor="ffcccc" 
| 41
| January 25
| @ Chicago
| 
| Damon Stoudamire (26)
| Popeye Jones (16)
| Damon Stoudamire (11)
| United Center23,913
| 14-27
|- bgcolor="bbffbb" 
| 42
| January 28
| Portland
| 
| Doug Christie (33)
| Clifford Rozier (11)
| Damon Stoudamire (13)
| SkyDome15,327
| 15-27
|- bgcolor="ffcccc" 
| 43
| January 29
| @ Philadelphia
| 
| Damon Stoudamire (25)
| Popeye Jones (10)
| Doug Christie (6)
| CoreStates Center11,251
| 15-28

|- bgcolor="bbffbb" 
| 44
| February 1
| Phoenix
| 
| Walt Williams (33)
| Popeye Jones (14)
| Damon Stoudamire (13)
| SkyDome19,405
| 16-28
|- bgcolor="ffcccc" 
| 45
| February 3
| Boston
| 
| Damon Stoudamire (26)
| Popeye Jones (11)
| Damon Stoudamire (10)
| SkyDome15,259
| 16-29
|- bgcolor="bbffbb" 
| 46
| February 5
| Cleveland
| 
| Walt Williams (26)
| Clifford Rozier (9)
| Damon Stoudamire (10)
| SkyDome16,520
| 17-29
|- bgcolor="ffcccc" 
| 47
| February 11
| @ Milwaukee
| 
| Walt Williams (27)
| Popeye Jones (14)
| Damon Stoudamire (12)
| Bradley Center13,257
| 17-30
|- bgcolor="ffcccc" 
| 48
| February 12
| @ Atlanta
| 
| Damon Stoudamire, Walt Williams (15)
| Clifford Rozier (7)
| Damon Stoudamire (3)
| Omni Coliseum13,846
| 17-31
|- bgcolor="ffcccc" 
| 49
| February 14
| Milwaukee
| 
| Marcus Camby (21)
| Oliver Miller (12)
| Damon Stoudamire (14)
| Maple Leaf Gardens15,193
| 17-32
|- bgcolor="ffcccc" 
| 50
| February 16
| Detroit
| 
| Walt Williams (22)
| Clifford Rozier (11)
| Damon Stoudamire (15)
| Maple Leaf Gardens15,492
| 17-33
|- bgcolor="ffcccc" 
| 51
| February 17
| @ Indiana
| 
| Damon Stoudamire (23)
| Oliver Miller (8)
| Damon Stoudamire (11)
| Market Square Arena14,298
| 17-34
|- bgcolor="bbffbb" 
| 52
| February 19
| @ San Antonio
| 
| Damon Stoudamire (21)
| Popeye Jones (11)
| Damon Stoudamire (9)
| Alamodome13,179
| 18-34
|- bgcolor="ffcccc" 
| 53
| February 20
| @ Houston
| 
| Damon Stoudamire (17)
| Popeye Jones (10)
| Damon Stoudamire (7)
| The Summit16,285
| 18-35
|- bgcolor="bbffbb" 
| 54
| February 22
| @ Dallas
| 
| Doug Christie (22)
| Oliver Miller (8)
| Damon Stoudamire (9)
| Reunion Arena16,314
| 19-35
|- bgcolor="bbffbb" 
| 55
| February 25
| @ Denver
| 
| Damon Stoudamire (35)
| Popeye Jones (7)
| Damon Stoudamire (5)
| McNichols Sports Arena9,225
| 20-35
|- bgcolor="ffcccc" 
| 56
| February 27
| @ Utah
| 
| Walt Williams (32)
| Popeye Jones, Carlos Rogers (8)
| Damon Stoudamire (8)
| Delta Center19,911
| 20-36
|- bgcolor="ffcccc" 
| 57
| February 28
| @ L.A. Clippers
| 
| Damon Stoudamire (22)
| Carlos Rogers (11)
| Doug Christie, Damon Stoudamire (5)
| Los Angeles Memorial Sports Arena8,574
| 20-37

|- bgcolor="ffcccc" 
| 58
| March 3
| Boston
| 
| Carlos Rogers (17)
| Carlos Rogers, Damon Stoudamire (7)
| Damon Stoudamire (17)
| SkyDome15,385
| 20-38
|- bgcolor="ffcccc" 
| 59
| March 5
| New York
| 
| Marcus Camby, Doug Christie (24)
| Marcus Camby (9)
| Damon Stoudamire (8)
| SkyDome18,319
| 20-39
|- bgcolor="ffcccc" 
| 60
| March 7
| San Antonio
| 
| Damon Stoudamire (25)
| Marcus Camby (9)
| Doug Christie (9)
| SkyDome16,178
| 20-40
|- bgcolor="bbffbb" 
| 61
| March 9
| Vancouver
| 
| Walt Williams (16)
| Marcus Camby (12)
| Damon Stoudamire (10)
| SkyDome19,186
| 21-40
|- bgcolor="bbffbb" 
| 62
| March 11
| @ Phoenix
| 
| Marcus Camby (23)
| Clifford Rozier (14)
| Damon Stoudamire (9)
| America West Arena19,023
| 22-40
|- bgcolor="bbffbb" 
| 63
| March 13
| @ Sacramento
| 
| Damon Stoudamire (31)
| Marcus Camby, Walt Williams (6)
| Damon Stoudamire (6)
| ARCO Arena17,317
| 23-40
|- bgcolor="ffcccc" 
| 64
| March 15
| @ Golden State
| 
| Marcus Camby (27)
| Marcus Camby (9)
| Damon Stoudamire (14)
| San Jose Arena15,058
| 23-41
|- bgcolor="ffcccc" 
| 65
| March 16
| @ L.A. Lakers
| 
| Damon Stoudamire (25)
| Marcus Camby (11)
| Damon Stoudamire (8)
| Great Western Forum16,839
| 23-42
|- bgcolor="bbffbb" 
| 66
| March 18
| Philadelphia
| 
| Marcus Camby (36)
| Doug Christie, Damon Stoudamire (10)
| Damon Stoudamire (12)
| Maple Leaf Gardens15,219
| 24-42
|- bgcolor="bbffbb" 
| 67
| March 19
| @ Detroit
| 
| Marcus Camby (28)
| Marcus Camby (14)
| Doug Christie (7)
| The Palace of Auburn Hills21,454
| 25-42
|- bgcolor="ffcccc" 
| 68
| March 21
| Charlotte
| 
| Damon Stoudamire (29)
| Marcus Camby (16)
| Doug Christie (9)
| SkyDome16,993
| 25-43
|- bgcolor="ffcccc" 
| 69
| March 23
| Atlanta
| 
| Marcus Camby (37)
| Marcus Camby, Walt Williams (8)
| Damon Stoudamire (9)
| SkyDome18,533
| 25-44
|- bgcolor="ffcccc" 
| 70
| March 25
| Indiana
| 
| Walt Williams (16)
| Marcus Camby (10)
| Damon Stoudamire (6)
| SkyDome15,763
| 25-45
|- bgcolor="ffcccc" 
| 71
| March 27
| Chicago
| 
| Damon Stoudamire (18)
| Clifford Rozier (10)
| Damon Stoudamire (12)
| SkyDome34,104
| 25-46
|- bgcolor="ffcccc" 
| 72
| March 28
| @ Washington
| 
| Doug Christie (17)
| Reggie Slater (10)
| Damon Stoudamire (3)
| USAir Arena18,756
| 25-47
|- bgcolor="bbffbb" 
| 73
| March 30
| Miami
| 
| Damon Stoudamire (35)
| Popeye Jones (12)
| Damon Stoudamire (11)
| SkyDome17,959
| 26-47

|- bgcolor="bbffbb"
| 74
| April 2
| @ Philadelphia
| 
| Doug Christie (29)
| Doug Christie (15)
| Damon Stoudamire (15)
| CoreStates Center13,769
| 27-47
|- bgcolor="ffcccc" 
| 75
| April 5
| @ Miami
| 
| Damon Stoudamire (25)
| Marcus Camby, Clifford Rozier (6)
| Damon Stoudamire (7)
| Miami Arena15,200
| 27-48
|- bgcolor="bbffbb" 
| 76
| April 8
| Washington
| 
| Damon Stoudamire (29)
| Clifford Rozier (10)
| Damon Stoudamire (13)
| SkyDome17,159
| 28-48
|- bgcolor="ffcccc" 
| 77
| April 10
| Orlando
| 
| Sharone Wright (17)
| Popeye Jones (12)
| Damon Stoudamire (5)
| SkyDome20,280
| 28-49
|- bgcolor="ffcccc" 
| 78
| April 12
| Indiana
| 
| Damon Stoudamire (22)
| Popeye Jones, Clifford Rozier (11)
| Damon Stoudamire (11)
| SkyDome21,832
| 28-50
|- bgcolor="ffcccc" 
| 79
| April 14
| @ Chicago
| 
| Damon Stoudamire (29)
| Carlos Rogers (12)
| Damon Stoudamire (12)
| United Center23,896
| 28-51
|- bgcolor="ffcccc" 
| 80
| April 15
| @ Milwaukee
| 
| Reggie Slater (19)
| Clifford Rozier (13)
| Damon Stoudamire (11)
| Bradley Center14,652
| 28-52
|- bgcolor="bbffbb" 
| 81
| April 18
| @ Charlotte
| 
| Damon Stoudamire (28)
| Marcus Camby, Popeye Jones (8)
| Damon Stoudamire (9)
| Charlotte Coliseum24,042
| 29-52
|- bgcolor="bbffbb" 
| 82
| April 20
| @ Boston
| 
| Damon Stoudamire (32)
| Popeye Jones (12)
| Damon Stoudamire (6)
| FleetCenter17,820
| 30-52

Player statistics

Regular season

* Statistics include only games with the Raptors

Award winners
 Marcus Camby, First Team, NBA All-Rookie Team

Transactions

References

External links
 1996-97 Toronto Raptors season at Basketball Reference
 1996-97 Toronto Raptors season at Database Basketball

Toronto Raptors seasons
Toronto
Tor